Kerem is a surname of multiple origins: Estonian and Hebrew ("vineyard"). Notable people with the surname include:
Batsheva Kerem 
Dana Kerem (born 1986),  Israeli footballer
Jüri Kerem (1943-1993), Estonian caricaturist and portraitist
Mihkel Kerem (born 1981),  Estonian composer and violinist